Jinshajiang Road is an interchange station on Lines 3, 4, and 13 of the Shanghai Metro. It is located in Putuo District, Shanghai and is one of the stations where Lines 3 and 4 share tracks.

On 30 December 2012, the Line 13 portion of the Jinshajiang Road station began its test runs, providing service westbound towards . Although service did not include mobile or Wi-Fi signals, the metro did provide service from this station to five stations in Jiading District, including Line 13's initial northern terminus, .

The station served as the eastern terminus of Line 13 until the opening of the eastern extension to Changshou Road on 28 December 2014.

During the 2021 Shanghai People’s Congress deputies suggested to change the station name to East China Normal University. The naming the station Jinshajiang Road isn't ideal because none of its exits is on Jinshajiang Road and people might confuse it with the West Jinshajiang Road Station on Line 13.

Location
The station is next to the Global Harbor shopping mall, which opened on 5 July 2013. It is attached directly to the mall underground. The station is also near East China Normal University's Putuo campus.

Gallery

References 

Shanghai Metro stations in Putuo District
Line 3, Shanghai Metro
Line 4, Shanghai Metro
Line 13, Shanghai Metro
Railway stations in China opened in 2000
Railway stations in Shanghai